Raymond Wang Chong Lin (May 12, 1921 – February 2, 2010) was the Roman Catholic bishop of the Roman Catholic Diocese of Zhaoxian, China.

Ordained to the priesthood in 1950, Wang Chong Lin was secretly ordained bishop in 1983 and eventually was enthroned in a public ceremony.

Wang Chong Lin died of a cerebral hemorrhage on February 2, 2010.

Notes

1921 births
2010 deaths
20th-century Roman Catholic bishops in China